In music, a pitch class (p.c. or pc) is a set of all pitches that are a whole number of octaves apart; for example, the pitch class C consists of the Cs in all octaves. "The pitch class C stands for all possible Cs, in whatever octave position." Important to musical set theory, a pitch class is "all pitches related to each other by octave, enharmonic equivalence, or both." Thus, using scientific pitch notation, the pitch class "C" is the set

{Cn : n is an integer} = {..., C−2, C−1, C0, C1, C2, C3 ...}.

Although there is no formal upper or lower limit to this sequence, only a few of these pitches are audible to humans. 
Pitch class is important because human pitch-perception is periodic: pitches belonging to the same pitch class are perceived as having a similar quality or color, a property called "octave equivalence".

Psychologists refer to the quality of a pitch as its "chroma". A chroma is an attribute of pitches (as opposed to tone height), just like hue is an attribute of color. A pitch class is a set of all pitches that share the same chroma, just like "the set of all white things" is the collection of all white objects.

Note that in standard Western equal temperament, distinct spellings can refer to the same sounding object: B3, C4, and D4 all refer to the same pitch, hence share the same chroma, and therefore belong to the same pitch class. This phenomenon is called enharmonic equivalence.

Integer notation
To avoid the problem of enharmonic spellings, theorists typically represent pitch classes using numbers beginning from zero, with each successively larger integer representing a pitch class that would be one semitone higher than the preceding one, if they were all realised as actual pitches in the same octave. Because octave-related pitches belong to the same class, when an octave is reached, the numbers begin again at zero. This cyclical system is referred to as modular arithmetic and, in the usual case of chromatic twelve-tone scales, pitch-class numbering is regarded as "modulo 12" (customarily abbreviated "mod 12" in the music-theory literature)—that is, every twelfth member is identical. One can map a pitch's fundamental frequency f (measured in hertz) to a real number p using the equation

This creates a linear pitch space in which octaves have size 12, semitones (the distance between adjacent keys on the piano keyboard) have size 1, and middle C (C4) is assigned the number 0 (thus, the pitches on piano are −39 to +48). Indeed, the mapping from pitch to real numbers defined in this manner forms the basis of the MIDI Tuning Standard, which uses the real numbers from 0 to 127 to represent the pitches C−1 to G9 (thus, middle C is 60). To represent pitch classes, we need to identify or "glue together" all pitches belonging to the same pitch class—i.e. all numbers p and p + 12. The result is a cyclical quotient group that musicians call pitch class space and mathematicians call R/12Z. Points in this space can be labelled using real numbers in the range 0 ≤ x < 12. These numbers provide numerical alternatives to the letter names of elementary music theory: 

0 = C, 1 = C/D, 2 = D, 2.5 = D (quarter tone sharp), 3 = D/E,

and so on. In this system, pitch classes represented by integers are classes of twelve-tone equal temperament (assuming standard concert A).

In music, integer notation is the translation of pitch classes and/or interval classes into whole numbers. Thus if C = 0, then C = 1 ... A = 10, B = 11, with "10" and "11" substituted by "t" and "e" in some sources, A and B in others (like the duodecimal numeral system, which also uses "t" and "e", or A and B, for "10" and "11"). This allows the most economical presentation of information regarding post-tonal materials.

In the integer model of pitch, all pitch classes and intervals between pitch classes are designated using the numbers 0 through 11. It is not used to notate music for performance, but is a common analytical and compositional tool when working with chromatic music, including twelve tone, serial, or otherwise atonal music.

Pitch classes can be notated in this way by assigning the number 0 to some note and assigning consecutive integers to consecutive semitones; so if 0 is C natural, 1 is C, 2 is D and so on up to 11, which is B. The C above this is not 12, but 0 again (12 − 12 = 0). Thus arithmetic modulo 12 is used to represent octave equivalence. One advantage of this system is that it ignores the "spelling" of notes (B, C and D are all 0) according to their diatonic functionality.

Disadvantages
There are a few disadvantages with integer notation. First, theorists have traditionally used the same integers to indicate elements of different tuning systems. Thus, the numbers 0, 1, 2, ... 5, are used to notate pitch classes in 6-tone equal temperament. This means that the meaning of a given integer changes with the underlying tuning system: "1" can refer to C in 12-tone equal temperament, but D in 6-tone equal temperament.

Also, the same numbers are used to represent both pitches and intervals. For example, the number 4 serves both as a label for the pitch class E (if C = 0) and as a label for the distance between the pitch classes D and F. (In much the same way, the term "10 degrees" can label both a temperature and the distance between two temperatures.) Only one of these labelings is sensitive to the (arbitrary) choice of pitch class 0. For example, if one makes a different choice about which pitch class is labeled 0, then the pitch class E will no longer be labeled "4". However, the distance between D and F will still be assigned the number 4. Both this and the issue in the paragraph directly above may be viewed as disadvantages (though mathematically, an element "4" should not be confused with the function "+4").

Other ways to label pitch classes

The system described above is flexible enough to describe any pitch class in any tuning system: for example, one can use the numbers {0, 2.4, 4.8, 7.2, 9.6} to refer to the five-tone scale that divides the octave evenly. However, in some contexts, it is convenient to use alternative labeling systems.  For example, in just intonation, we may express pitches in terms of positive rational numbers , expressed by reference to a 1 (often written ""), which represents a fixed pitch. If a and b are two positive rational numbers, they belong to the same pitch class if and only if

for some integer n. Therefore, we can represent pitch classes in this system using ratios  where neither p nor q is divisible by 2, that is, as ratios of odd integers. Alternatively, we can represent just intonation pitch classes by reducing to the octave, 1 ≤  < 2.

It is also very common to label pitch classes with reference to some scale.  For example, one can label the pitch classes of n-tone equal temperament using the integers 0 to n − 1. In much the same way, one could label the pitch classes of the C major scale, C–D–E–F–G–A–B, using the numbers from 0 to 6.  This system has two advantages over the continuous labeling system described above.  First, it eliminates any suggestion that there is something natural about a twelvefold division of the octave.  Second, it avoids pitch-class universes with unwieldy decimal expansions when considered relative to 12; for example, in the continuous system, the pitch-classes of 19 equal temperament are labeled 0.63158..., 1.26316..., etc. Labeling these pitch classes {0, 1, 2, 3 ..., 18} simplifies the arithmetic used in pitch-class set manipulations.

The disadvantage of the scale-based system is that it assigns an infinite number of different names to chords that sound identical.  For example, in twelve-tone equal-temperament the C major triad is notated {0, 4, 7}.  In twenty-four-tone equal-temperament, this same triad is labeled {0, 8, 14}.  Moreover, the scale-based system appears to suggest that different tuning systems use steps of the same size ("1") but have octaves of differing size ("12" in 12-tone equal-temperament, "19" in 19-tone equal temperament, and so on), whereas in fact the opposite is true: different tuning systems divide the same octave into different-sized steps.

In general, it is often more useful to use the traditional integer system when one is working within a single temperament; when one is comparing chords in different temperaments, the continuous system can be more useful.

See also 
Flat (music)
Sharp (music)
Pitch circularity
Pitch interval
Tone row (List)

References

Further reading
Purwins, Hendrik (2005). "Profiles of Pitch Classes: Circularity of Relative Pitch and Key—Experiments, Models, Computational Music Analysis, and Perspectives". Ph.D. Thesis. Berlin: Technische Universität Berlin.
Rahn, John (1980). Basic Atonal Theory. New York: Longman; London and Toronto: Prentice Hall International.  . Reprinted 1987, New York: Schirmer Books; London: Collier Macmillan.
Schuijer, Michiel (2008). Analyzing Atonal Music: Pitch-Class Set Theory and Its Contexts. Eastman Studies in Music 60. Rochester, NY: University of Rochester Press. .

Musical notation
Musical set theory
Pitch (music)